Salome with the Head of John the Baptist is an oil on canvas painting by the 17th century painter Matthias Stom. It is now in the Palazzo Bianco of the Musei di Strada Nuova in Genoa, to whose collections it was left in 1926 by E. L. Peirano. Typically of the painter's style, it combines Flemish attention to detail with the lessons he had learned from Caravaggio's work.

References

Paintings by Matthias Stom
Paintings depicting Salome
Paintings depicting John the Baptist
Paintings in the collection of the Musei di Strada Nuova